James Brown Clay (November 9, 1817 – January 26, 1864) was an American politician and diplomat who served as a member of the United States House of Representatives for Kentucky's 8th congressional district from 1857 to 1859.

Early life and education 
Born in Washington, D.C., while his father, Henry Clay, was serving in the United States Congress, James Brown Clay was named for the husband of his maternal aunt, James Brown. His brothers were Henry Clay, Jr. and John Morrison Clay. Clay attended a boys' school associated with Kenyon College, Gambier, Ohio (founded by family friend Bishop Philander Chase). Later, Clay attended Transylvania University in Lexington, Kentucky.

Career 
He worked at a countinghouse in Boston from 1832 to 1834 before studying law and being admitted to the bar. He practiced law with his father in Lexington, Kentucky.

Clay served as chargé d'affaires to Portugal from August 1, 1849, to July 19, 1850. He farmed in Missouri in 1851 and 1852 before returning to Lexington. Clay had been a lifelong member of the Whig Party. But when the Whig Party disintegrated following Henry Clay's death, and due to the controversy surrounding the Kansas–Nebraska Act, Clay joined the Democratic Party. He was elected to the Thirty-fifth Congress (March 4, 1857 – March 3, 1859). Clay did not run for renomion in 1858 and declined an appointment by President James Buchanan to a mission to Germany. His father having died, Clay returned to Lexington and farmed using enslaved labor, and his household also included three male boarders. In the 1860 census he owned a dozen slaves in Fayette County (surrounding Lexington).

Clay was a member of the Peace Conference of 1861 held in Washington, D.C., an attempt to prevent the impending American Civil War. During the Civil War Clay supported the Confederacy and was commissioned to raise a regiment. Ill-health from tuberculosis prevented Clay from doing so.

Personal life 
In 1843, Clay married Susan Maria Jacob, the daughter of Louisville's first millionaire and sister of its later mayor, Charles Donald Jacob. The couple eventually had ten children.

Death and legacy
Clay died in Montreal, Quebec, Canada, where he had gone for his health. He is interred at his family plot in Lexington Cemetery.

See also
Henry Clay
Ashland (Henry Clay home)
Clay family
Henry Clay, Jr.
Susan Clay Sawitzky
Thomas Clay McDowell

References

 This article incorporates facts obtained from the public domain Biographical Directory of the United States Congress.
 On Clay's service as American chargé d'affaires to Portugal, see Sara B. Bearss, "Henry Clay and the American Claims against Portugal, 1850," Journal of the Early Republic 7 (Summer 1987): 167–80.

External links
James Brown Clay's official Congressional biography
The Filson Historical Society
Clay Family Papers at the Library of Congress
Ashland, the Henry Clay Estate

1817 births
1864 deaths
19th-century American diplomats
Ambassadors of the United States to Portugal
Transylvania University alumni
Kentucky lawyers
American people of English descent
Kenyon College alumni
American racehorse owners and breeders
Henry Clay family
Kentucky Whigs
Democratic Party members of the United States House of Representatives from Kentucky
19th-century American politicians